The Casa da Guiné (English: House of Guinea), later known as the Casa da Guiné e Mina and also referred to as the Portuguese Guinea Company, was a state-run Portuguese commercial institution, tasked with the management of the Portuguese Empire's economic interests and colonization in West Africa, particularly on the Gulf of Guinea, on the Gold Coast, and on the Slave Coast.

History
Founded in 1443, during the Age of Discoveries, under the auspices of Prince Henry the Navigator, the Casa da Guiné would later be absorbed into the Casa da Índia in 1503.

Operations
It monitored and enforced the Crown's monopoly, coordinated voyages, maintained warehouses, fixed prices, and performed other roles associated with the Spice trade.

See also
 Casa da Índia
 Portuguese Guinea
 Mozambique Company
 Portuguese Empire

References
Company of Guinea on the FOTW

History of Guinea-Bissau
Portuguese Empire
Chartered companies
Defunct companies of Portugal
1482 establishments in the Portuguese Empire
1503 disestablishments in Portugal
Companies established in the 15th century
Organizations established in the 1480s
Companies disestablished in the 16th century
Organizations disestablished in the 1500s
Monarchy and money